Polistes africanus  is a species of paper wasp found in Africa. Its range includes Senegal, Liberia, Nigeria, Cameroon, Zaire, Kenya, Somalia, Tanzania including Zanzibar, Comoros and South Africa (Kwazulu-Natal, Western Cape Province).

References

External links
 
 

africanus
Insects described in 1818